Amelia Webb Cooke (born Colorado Springs, Colorado, May 24, 1979) is an American model, actress, and former professional ballet dancer. She made her film debut with Species III, and later starred in the 2007 science fiction action film Alien Agent. She also starred in the television series Tilt.

Biography
Though born in Colorado Springs, she was raised in Toronto, Ontario, Canada. Prior to acting, Cooke studied at the Canadian National Ballet for ten years and toured with the organization as a student. She was awarded the "Outstanding Athlete of the Year" in Toronto in 1997. She later won the "Elite Look of the Year" model search in Canada and went on to work as a model in Germany, Paris and Milan in Europe, Tokyo in Japan, and Australia.

Her older brother is video game designer Jeramy Cooke.

She is married with two children and lives in Pupukia, Hawaii.

Filmography

References

External links
 

1979 births
American film actresses
Living people
21st-century American actresses